The 2008 United States presidential election in Illinois took place on November 4, 2008, and was part of the 2008 United States presidential election. Voters chose 21 representatives, or electors to the Electoral College, who voted for president and vice president.

Barack Obama won the race in his home state with a 25.1% margin of victory. Prior to the election, every major news organization considered this a state Obama would win, or otherwise considered as a safe blue state. One of the most reliably blue states in the nation, Illinois has not voted for a Republican presidential nominee since 1988, when George H. W. Bush narrowly carried the state. In 2008, continuing that trend, it appeared that a generic Democratic presidential nominee could have easily won Illinois; it was no surprise that Barack Obama, who represented Illinois in the U.S. Senate, won Illinois in 2008 over Republican John McCain in a landslide victory, clinching near 62 percent of the total vote.

, this is the last time a Democrat won the following counties: Boone, Bureau, Cass, Calhoun, Coles, Gallatin, Grundy, Kankakee, LaSalle, Macon, Macoupin, Madison, Mason, McDonough, McHenry, Montgomery, Pulaski, Sangamon, Schuyler, Stephenson, and Vermillion.

As of 2020, Obama is the only presidential candidate of either party to win the state with more than 60% of the vote since Warren G. Harding in 1920, and the only Democrat to do so since Andrew Jackson, the Democratic Party's first presidential nominee, in 1828 and 1832. McCain's 36.78% of the vote is the second-lowest of any major-party nominee since 1924, only surpassing George H. W. Bush in 1992 when a substantial amount of the vote went to Ross Perot running as an independent.

Illinois was one of three states where Obama outperformed Franklin D. Roosevelt in all four of his runs, as well as Lyndon Johnson in his 1964 landslide. The others were rapidly Democratic-trending Vermont and Delaware, the latter being the home state of Joe Biden, Obama's running mate.

This was the last time Illinois voted to the left of California.
This remains the most recent presidential election where the Democratic nominee would have prevailed in the state of Illinois even if Cook County's votes were subtracted from both candidates.

Primaries

Turnout

For the state-run primaries (Democratic, Republican, and Green), turnout was 40.26%, with 2,940,708 votes cast. For the general election, turnout was 70.90%, with 5,522,371 votes cast.

State-run primaries were held for both major parties, as well as the Green Party, on February 5.

Democratic

The 2008 Illinois Democratic presidential primary took place on Super Tuesday, February 5, 2008, with 153 delegates at stake. The winner in each of Illinois's 19 congressional districts was awarded all of that district's delegates, totaling 100. Another 53 delegates were awarded to the statewide winner, Barack Obama. The 153 delegates represented Illinois at the Democratic National Convention in Denver, Colorado. Thirty-two other unpledged delegates, known as superdelegates, also attended the convention and cast their votes as well.

Polls

Polls indicated that then-U.S. Senator Barack Obama was leading then-U.S. Senator Hillary Clinton by double digits in the days before the contest in his home state of Illinois.

Results

Chicago Public Radio reported on March 13, 2008, that the delegate counts were recalculated and Obama won 106 delegates to 47 for
Clinton.

During the state by state roll-call at the Democratic National Convention, the Illinois delegation declined to cast their votes.

Analysis
It was no surprise that Barack Obama cruised to a landslide victory in Illinois, the state he had represented in the U.S. Senate since 2005. He enjoyed massive support in his state among all demographics. According to exit polls, 57% of voters in the Illinois Democratic Primary were white and they opted for Obama 57–41; 24% of voters were African American and they, too, backed Obama 93–5; and 17 percent of voters in the primary were Hispanic/Latino and they narrowly backed Obama 50–49. Obama won all age groups but tied Clinton among senior citizens aged 65 and over. He won all voters in the state of all educational attainment levels as well as income/socioeconomic classes. He won all ideological groups and voters from both parties as well as self-identified Independents. Regarding religion, Obama won every major denomination except Roman Catholics, who narrowly backed Clinton 50-48%. Obama won Protestants by a margin of 58–38, other Christians 79–19, other religions 82–17, and atheists/agnostics 78–21.

Obama performed extremely well statewide and racked up massive victories in his home city of Chicago as well as its suburbs and the metropolitan area. He also won Northern Illinois as well as the collar counties by substantial victories. Clinton's best performance was in Southern Illinois among the more rural and conservative counties that are majority white, although Obama still won the region as a whole.

Republican

The 2008 Illinois Republican presidential primary was held on February 5, 2008 in the U.S. state of Illinois as one of the Republican Party's state primaries ahead of the 2008 presidential election. Illinois was one of 24 States holding a primary or caucus on Super Tuesday. Delegates from each of Illinois' 19 congressional districts are selected by direct election. In addition, the primary ballot also contains a preference poll that lists the presidential candidates.

*Candidate withdrew prior to the primary

Green

The 2008 Illinois Green Party presidential primary was held on February 5, 2008 in the U.S. state of Illinois as one of the Green Party's state primaries ahead of the 2008 presidential election.

By virtue of Green Party candidate Rich Whitney's performance in the 2006 Illinois gubernatorial election, the party had earned the right to have a state-run primary in 2008.

Campaign

Predictions 
There were 16 news organizations who made state-by-state predictions of the election. Here are their last predictions before election day:

Polling

Obama won every single pre-election poll, and each by a double-digit margin and with at least 52% (with the exception of an ARG poll). The final 3 polls averaged Obama leading 60% to 35%.

Fundraising
Obama raised $35,307,625. McCain raised $7,207,428.

Advertising and visits
Obama spent $23,319. McCain and interest groups spent $52,865. The Democratic ticket visited the state 13 times. McCain's ticket visited the state twice.

Analysis
For most of the second half of the 20th century, Illinois was reckoned as a Republican-leaning swing state. It voted Republican in every election from 1952 to 1988, save for 1960 and 1964. However, George H. W. Bush just barely won the state in 1988, and it swung heavily to Bill Clinton and the Democrats in 1992. Since then, Democrats have won the state by fairly comfortable margins, and it is now reckoned as the most solidly Democratic state in the Midwest.

The blue trend in the Land of Lincoln in presidential elections can be largely attributed to Cook County, home to Chicago, which makes up about 41.2% of the state's total population. While Chicago has been a Democratic stronghold for decades, the suburban areas of Cook County have historically tilted Republican. However, the brand of Republicanism in the suburbs has historically been moderate, and these areas swung Democratic as the national party moved more to the right.  Democrats also do very well in the Illinois portions of the Quad Cities and St. Louis areas.  Additionally, the historically Republican collar counties near Chicago – DuPage, Lake, McHenry, Kane, and Will – have become friendlier to Democrats at the national level.

Barack Obama, the junior U.S. senator from Illinois at the time of the election, carried the state handily, defeating John McCain of Arizona by a margin of 1.38 million votes. Obama carried his home county, Cook County, with roughly 76% of the vote, the highest percentage of any Democratic presidential candidate since its incorporation in 1831. He also swept all five collar counties, becoming the first Democratic candidate since Franklin Pierce in 1852 to do so, with DuPage, Kendall, Lake, and Will giving him double-digit margins.  Notably, DuPage, Kane, and McHenry had not supported a Democrat for president since that election. Obama improved on Kerry's performance enough that he would have prevailed in the state even if the Democratic stronghold Cook County's votes were excluded, albeit by a narrower margin of 1,790,324 votes to McCain's 1,543,443 or 53.7% - 46.3% of the two-party vote.

Obama also did very well in several rural counties that historically voted Republican. He became the first Democrat to win Carroll County since that county was created in 1839, in the process breaking the last remaining Republican streak stretching from initial GOP candidate John C. Frémont in 1856, and the first Democrat to win Boone County since James K. Polk in 1844. McCain did, however, win several of the more rural counties in Southern Illinois; Obama thus became the first-ever Democrat to win the White House without carrying Christian County, as well as the first to do so without carrying Franklin, Hardin, Jefferson, Jersey, Perry, Pike, Randolph, Saline, or Williamson Counties since John F. Kennedy in 1960, and the first to do so without carrying Clinton or Pope Counties since Jimmy Carter in 1976.  It was not nearly enough, however, to put a serious dent in Obama's 25-point margin in the state.

During the same election, senior U.S. Senator and Senate Majority Whip Dick Durbin, a Democrat, was reelected to the U.S. Senate with 67.84% of the vote over Republican Dr. Steve Sauerberg who received 28.53%. At the state level, Democrats picked up three seats in the Illinois House of Representatives.

As of the 2020 presidential election, this is the last presidential election that a Democrat won all of Chicago's collar counties.

Results

Results by county

Counties that flipped from Republican to Democratic
 Boone (largest city: Belvidere)
 Bureau (largest city: Princeton)
 Carroll (largest city: Savanna)
 Cass (largest city: Beardstown)
 Coles (largest city: Charleston)
 DeKalb (largest city: DeKalb)
 DuPage (largest city: Aurora)
 Gallatin (largest city: Shawneetown)
 Grundy (largest city: Morris)
 Henry (largest city: Kewanee)
 Kane (largest city: Aurora)
 Jo Daviess (largest city: Galena)
 Kankakee (largest city: Kankakee)
 Kendall (largest village: Oswego)
 Lake (largest city: Waukegan)
 LaSalle (largest city: Ottawa)
 Macon (largest city: Decatur)
 Macoupin (largest city: Carlinville)
 Mason (largest city: Havana)
 McDonough (largest city: Macomb)
 McHenry (largest city: Crystal Lake)
 McLean (largest city: Bloomington)
 Montgomery (largest city: Litchfield)
 Pulaski (largest city: Mounds)
 Sangamon (largest city: Springfield)
 Schuyler (largest city: Rushville)
 Stephenson (largest city: Freeport)
Vermilion (Largest city: Danville)
 Warren (largest city: Monmouth)
 Will (largest city: Joliet)
 Winnebago (largest city: Rockford)

By congressional district
Barack Obama won 16 of the state's 19 congressional districts, including four districts held by Republicans.

Electors

Technically the voters of Illinois cast their ballots for electors: representatives to the Electoral College. Illinois is allocated 21 electors because it has 19 congressional districts and 2 senators. All candidates who appear on the ballot or qualify to receive write-in votes must submit a list of 21 electors, who pledge to vote for their candidate and his or her running mate. Whoever wins the majority of votes in the state is awarded all 21 electoral votes. Their chosen electors then vote for president and vice president. Although electors are pledged to their candidate and running mate, they are not obligated to vote for them. An elector who votes for someone other than his or her candidate is known as a faithless elector.

The electors of each state and the District of Columbia met on December 15, 2008, to cast their votes for president and vice president. The Electoral College itself never meets as one body. Instead the electors from each state and the District of Columbia met in their respective capitols.

The following were the members of the Electoral College from the state. All 21 were pledged to Barack Obama and Joe Biden:
Constance A. Howard
Carrie Austin
Shirley R. Madigan
Ricardo Muñoz
James DeLeo
Marge Friedman
Vera Davis
Nancy Shepardson
William Marovitz
Lauren Beth Gash
Debbie Halvorson
Molly McKenzie
Julia Kennedy Beckman
Mark Guethle
Lynn Foster
John M. Nelson
Mary Boland
Shirley McCombs
Don Johnston
Barbara Flynn Currie
John P. Daley

See also
 United States presidential elections in Illinois
 2008 Republican Party presidential primaries
 2008 Democratic Party presidential primaries

References

United States president
Illinois
2008

es:Primaria demócrata de Illinois, 2008